The 1992 Bulgarian Cup Final was the 52nd final of the Bulgarian Cup, and was contested between Levski Sofia and Pirin Blagoevgrad on 27 May 1992 at Georgi Benkovski Stadium in Pazardzhik. Levski won the final 5–0.

Match

Details

See also
1991–92 A Group

References

External links
Full video of the final at youtube.com

Bulgarian Cup finals
PFC Levski Sofia matches
OFC Pirin Blagoevgrad matches